Ibrahim Fahad Al Naimi is a Free Syrian Army brigadier general, who defected from the Syrian Army to the FSA. He founded the clan-based Southern Command on 5 September 2014 in Quneitra Governorate.

References

Living people
Year of birth missing (living people)
Syrian generals
Defectors to the Free Syrian Army